TTFD is an acronym, which can be applied to:
 To the Faithful Departed, a 1996 studio album by the Cranberries
 Thiamine tetrahydrofurfuryl disulfide, also known as Fursultiamine